Tiger Eyes is a 2012 film directed by Lawrence Blume based on the 1981 young adult novel of the same name, written by Judy Blume, and stars Willa Holland, Amy Jo Johnson and Tatanka Means. It follows the story of Davey, a young girl attempting to cope with the sudden death of her father and the subsequent uprooting of her life.

The film marks the first major motion picture adaptation from the work of author Judy Blume, whose books have sold more than 82 million copies in 41 countries.

Plot

Forced by her grieving mother to move from her home in Atlantic City, New Jersey, to the strange "atom bomb" town of Los Alamos, New Mexico, Davey no longer knows who to be or how to fit in.
Everything that once mattered—the friends, reputations, parties and expectations that fuel high school days—suddenly seems insignificant and Davey is certain no one has the first clue about the turmoil she is going through.

But when she meets Wolf, a mysterious Native American climber exploring the surrounding canyons, she feels he is able to see right into her most wild and secret emotions. Their intense relationship brings Davey back from the edge as she finds the courage to embark on the first great adventure of her life.

Cast
Willa Holland as Davey Wexler
Amy Jo Johnson as Gwen Wexler
Tatanka Means as Wolf
Elise Eberle as Jane Albertson
Cynthia Stevenson as Aunt Bitsy
Forest Fyre as Walter
Teo Olivares as Reuben
Russell Means as Mr. Ortiz

Reception
Released on June 7, 2013 the film garnered generally good reviews, with a 19 of 29 positive grade on Rotten Tomatoes for a final score of 66%.

References

External links
 
 
http://www.nj.com/entertainment/index.ssf/2012/05/judy_blumes_tiger_eyes.html
http://www.oneheadlightink.com/sindication/tag/tiger-eyes-movie/
http://www.sfgate.com/movies/article/Jewish-Film-Festival-Tiger-Eyes-a-Judy-Blume-3703358.php
 https://ew.com/article/2012/02/24/judy-blume-tiger-eyes-movie/
http://hollywoodcrush.mtv.com/2010/10/13/judy-blume-tiger-eyes/
http://montclairfilmfest.org/2012-festival/tiger-eyes/
http://www.baycitizen.org/blogs/citizen/novelist-judy-blume-premieres-tiger-eyes/
http://articles.sun-sentinel.com/2012-04-14/entertainment/fl-judy-blume-tiger-eyes-20120414_1_summer-sisters-lawrence-blume-novels
http://www.thedailybeast.com/cheats/2010/10/18/judy-blume-novel-tiger-eyes-to-become-movie.html
http://www.hollywoodreporter.com/news/exclusive-judy-blume-adapting-tiger-31335
http://voices.washingtonpost.com/celebritology/2010/10/judy_blumes_tiger_eyes_heads_t.html
http://www.blogher.com/tiger-eyes-judy-blume-movie-last
http://crushable.com/entertainment/with-tiger-eyes-a-judy-blume-book-will-finally-hit-the-big-screen-195/
http://jezebel.com/tiger-eyes-movie/
http://www.soundtrack.net/movie/tiger-eyes/

2012 films
2010s teen drama films
2010s teen romance films
American teen drama films
American teen romance films
Films based on American novels
Films set in New Mexico
Films about Native Americans
2012 drama films
2010s American films